The 1959 Kansas Jayhawks football team represented the University of Kansas in the Big Seven Conference during the 1959 NCAA University Division football season. In their second season under head coach Jack Mitchell, the Jayhawks compiled a 5–5 record (3–3 against conference opponents), tied for third in the Big Seven Conference, and outscored all opponents by a combined total of 163 to 134. They played their home games at Memorial Stadium in Lawrence, Kansas.

The team's statistical leaders included Curtis McClinton with 472 rushing yards, John Hadl with 126 receiving yards and Leland Flachsbarth with 345 passing yards. John Peppercorn and Ken Fitch were the team captains.

The Jayhawks Week 2 game against the eventual National Champion Syracuse was featured in the 2008 film The Express: The Ernie Davis Story.

Schedule

References

Kansas
Kansas Jayhawks football seasons
Kansas Jayhawks football